NFL Series could refer to:
In American football video games:
 EA's Madden NFL series
 Sega's NFL 2K series (1999-2004)
 NFL (series), a series of games by Gameloft
In toys:
 The McFarlane Sports Picks "NFL Series" of player figures (since 2001)
 Topps' "NFL Series" of trading cards, especially popular in the early 1990s